Vinod Phadke is an Indian politician and cricket administrator for Goa. He is member of the Maharashtrawadi Gomantak Party. He is Goa Cricket Association secretary was arrested for alleged misappropriation of BCCI funds.

He was also team manager of the Indian cricket team when South African cricket team toured to India in 2015–16.

References 

People from North Goa district
Living people
Goa politicians
21st-century Indian politicians
Maharashtrawadi Gomantak Party politicians
Year of birth missing (living people)